Thyrocopa epicapna is a moth of the family Xyloryctidae. It was first described by Edward Meyrick in 1883. It is endemic to the Hawaiian islands of Kauai, Lanai, Kahoolawe, Maui, Hawaii, and possibly Oahu.

The length of the forewings is 8–11 mm. Adults are on wing year round.

Larvae have been found at the base of grass tufts and in rotten wood, but this may be based on misidentifications.

External links

Thyrocopa
Endemic moths of Hawaii
Moths described in 1883